Bomber's Moon is a 1943 American wartime propaganda film, produced by 20th Century Fox, based on an unpublished magazine serial "Bomber's Moon" by Leonard Lee.

Plot
Captain Jeff Dakin (George Montgomery) is shot down over Germany on a bombing raid. He sees his brother, Danny (Richard Graham), serving on the same aircraft, shot dead as he parachutes out of the stricken aircraft.  Imprisoned in a camp, Dakin conspires with Alexandra "Alec" Zorich (Annabella), a beautiful Russian doctor, and Captain Paul Husnik (Kent Taylor), a Czech resistance leader, to mount an escape.  They escape during an air raid and make their way towards safety, but the Czech is not who he seems.

Husnik is really Gestapo officer Paul von Block, who wants to get Alec to lead him to the leaders of the Czech underground movement.  Killing the underground leader, von Block summons the Gestapo, but Dakin overpowers him and together with Alec, goes on the run. Reaching the Netherlands, Dakin learns that his bomber is now repaired, with the Nazis planning a mysterious flight to England. Disguised as a German soldier, Dakin finds out his brother's killer, Major. Von Streicher (Martin Kosleck), is to pilot the aircraft on a mission to kill Prime Minister Winston Churchill. Stealing a German aircraft, Dakin exacts his revenge by shooting down Von Streicher. Landing in England, he is reunited with Alec, who has made her way there.

Cast
 George Montgomery as Jeffrey Dakin
 Annabella as Alexandra "Alec" Zorich
 Kent Taylor as Paul von Block
 Walter Kingsford as Professor Mueller
 Martin Kosleck as Luftwaffe Maj. von Streicher
 Dennis Hoey as Gestapo Col. von Grunow
 Robert Barrat as Ernst
 Leon Tyler as Karl
 Lionel Royce as Derbitz
 Victor Kilian as Henryk van Seeler

Production
Although a low-budget production, entirely filmed at the 20th Century Fox studio lot, a total of six directors worked on the film. Shortly after completing Bomber's Moon, George Montgomery enlisted in the United States Army Air Corps and did not appear in another film until the 1946 20th Century Fox production Three Little Girls in Blue.  French actress Annabella also filmed Tonight We Raid Calais (1943) and 13 Rue Madeleine (1947).

Reception
Strictly a "B" film, Bomber's Moon was not well received. The contemporary review in The New York Times succinctly summed it up as "shoddy" and  "... second-rate Hollywood."

References
Notes

Bibliography

 Evans, Alun. Brassey's Guide to War Films. Dulles, Virginia: Potomac Books, 2000. .

External links
 
 
 

1943 films
1940s war films
20th Century Fox films
American aviation films
American World War II propaganda films
Films about shot-down aviators
American black-and-white films
Films directed by Harold D. Schuster
Films scored by David Buttolph
Films about the United States Army Air Forces
Films with screenplays by Aubrey Wisberg
Films about Nazi Germany
Films about prison escapes
1940s English-language films
World War II aviation films
World War II films made in wartime